Trent Peter Kelly (born 24 March 1984 in Henley Beach) is a former Australian cricketer who played first-class cricket for South Australia and Western Australia. In Adelaide, his grade cricket club was the Western Eagles.

Kelly was a right-arm paceman and right-handed batsman who played eight matches of first-class cricket between 2004 and 2011 and seven List A matches between 2002 and 2008. He retired in October 2015. Kelly was an assistant coach for the South Australian under-19 team at the 2014–15 Under 19 National Championships.

Since his retirement from playing, Kelly has worked as a groundsman in Adelaide. He supervised the preparation of the pitches used for the opening rounds of the 2020–21 Sheffield Shield season.

References

External links

1984 births
Living people
Australian cricketers
South Australia cricketers
Western Australia cricketers
Cricketers from Adelaide